The Americas Zone was the unique zone within Group 3 of the regional Davis Cup competition in 2019. The zone's competition was held in round robin format in Escazú, Costa Rica, from 17 to 22 June 2019.

Participating nations

Inactive nations

Draw
Date: 17–22 June

Location: Costa Rica Country Club, Escazú, Costa Rica (hard)

Format: Round-robin basis.

Seeding

 1Davis Cup Rankings as of 4 February 2019

Round Robin

Pool A

Pool B 

Standings are determined by: 1. number of wins; 2. number of matches; 3. in two-team ties, head-to-head records; 4. in three-team ties, (a) percentage of sets won (head-to-head records if two teams remain tied), then (b) percentage of games won (head-to-head records if two teams remain tied), then (c) Davis Cup rankings.

Playoffs

Round Robin

Pool A

Bahamas vs. Antigua and Barbuda

Puerto Rico vs. Costa Rica

Puerto Rico vs. U.S. Virgin Islands

Costa Rica vs. Antigua and Barbuda

Bahamas vs. Costa Rica

Antigua and Barbuda vs. U.S. Virgin Islands

Bahamas vs. U.S. Virgin Islands

Puerto Rico vs. Antigua and Barbuda

Bahamas vs. Puerto Rico

Costa Rica vs. U.S. Virgin Islands

Pool B

Honduras vs. Bermuda

Jamaica vs. Panama

Cuba vs. Trinidad and Tobago

Honduras vs. Cuba

Jamaica vs. Trinidad and Tobago

Panama vs. Bermuda

Honduras vs. Trinidad and Tobago

Jamaica vs. Bermuda

Cuba vs. Panama

Honduras vs. Panama

Jamaica vs. Cuba

Bermuda vs. Trinidad and Tobago

Honduras vs. Jamaica

Cuba vs. Bermuda

Panama vs. Trinidad and Tobago

Playoffs

1st to 2nd playoff

Costa Rica vs. Jamaica

3rd to 4th playoff

Puerto Rico vs. Cuba

5th to 6th playoff

Bahamas vs. Honduras

7th to 8th playoff

Antigua and Barbuda vs. Panama

9th to 10th playoff

U.S. Virgin Islands vs. Bermuda

References

External links
Official Website

Americas Zone Group III
Davis Cup Americas Zone